DUT1 (sometimes also written DUT) is a time correction equal to the difference between Universal Time (UT1), which is defined by Earth's rotation, and Coordinated Universal Time (UTC), which is defined by a network of precision atomic clocks.

DUT1 = UT1 − UTC

UTC is maintained via leap seconds, such that DUT1 remains within the range −0.9 s < DUT1 < +0.9 s. The reason for this correction is partly that the rate of rotation of the Earth is not constant, due to tidal braking and the redistribution of mass within the Earth, including its oceans and atmosphere, and partly because the SI second (as now used for UTC) was, when adopted, a little shorter than the current value of the second of mean solar time.

Daily observed values of DUT1 for the past week, and daily forecast values for the coming year, are published by IERS Bulletin A.

Several time signal services broadcast values of DUT1. CHU (Canada), HLA (South Korea), MSF (United Kingdom), and WWV (United States) transmit DUT1 with 0.1 s precision. In Russia, RWM, RTZ and the longwave RBU transmit DUT1 with 0.1 s precision and an additional correction dUT1 in 0.02 s increments.

See also

Notes

References

 ITU-R Recommendation TF.460-4: Standard-frequency and time-signal emissions. International Telecommunication Union.

External links
 IERS Bulletins, including Bulletin A – latest and past versions, and graphical plots
 Latest version of Bulletin A
IERS Rapid Service/Prediction Center via the US Naval Observatory (Archived version available for non-US readers)
 http://scienceworld.wolfram.com/astronomy/Time.html

Time scales